Sandwich Road railway station was a railway station on the East Kent Light Railway. It opened in May 1925 and closed to passenger traffic on 1 November 1928. There were plans to extend to Richboro Port railway station but permission to run passenger services north of Sandwich Road was not granted by His Majesty's Railway Inspectorate due to the poor state of repair of the bridge over the Southern Railway and River Stour. The platform was north of the road and a passing loop was south of the road. The station officially closed completely on 1 January 1950 although its use may have ceased earlier.

References

Sources
 

Sandwich, Kent
Disused railway stations in Kent
Former East Kent Light Railway stations
Railway stations in Great Britain opened in 1925
Railway stations in Great Britain closed in 1928